The Santa Clara Valley AVA is an American Viticultural Area located in Santa Clara County, California.  The area served an important role in the early history of California wine and was home to the pioneer winemakers Paul Masson and Charles Lefranc. The AVA boundary was defined in 1989. It includes the historic winegrowing areas of Santa Clara County which were not already part of the Santa Cruz Mountains AVA as well as the area near Mission San José in Alameda County and a small part of San Benito County.

The area served an important role in the early history of California wine and was home to the pioneer winemakers Paul Masson and Charles Lefranc. The AVA boundary was defined in 1989. The Santa Clara Valley AVA is home to two smaller AVAs, Pacheco Pass AVA and San Ysidro District AVA.

History
By the 1850s Santa Clara had more acres of vineyards than any other county in California. By 1883 the county had almost  of vines and over 100 wineries, but over-expansion and phylloxera took a heavy toll and by 1902 over  disappeared, mostly replanted to fruit trees such as prunes and apricots. By 1910 over half the wineries had disappeared.

Prohibition caused another boom in viticulture, with fruit being much in demand for home winemakers.

The population expanded because of the growth of high-tech businesses, and older Almaden Valley vineyards were uprooted to make way for urban sprawl. Today the majority of the remaining vineyards are found between the Diablo Mountains in Contra Costa and the Santa Cruz Mountains south of San Jose near Morgan Hill and Gilroy, with some in the foothills of the Santa Cruz Mountains near Saratoga. As of August 2014, a collaboration between the cities of Gilroy, Morgan Hill, and Santa Clara County, along with the Wineries of Santa Clara Valley, formed the "Santa Clara Valley Wine Trail" to connect the many wineries and aid in agritourism.

References

External links
  TTB AVA Map

American Viticultural Areas
American Viticultural Areas of the San Francisco Bay Area
Geography of Santa Clara County, California
1989 establishments in California